Carlos Andrés Sánchez Arcosa ((); born 2 December 1984) is a Uruguayan footballer who plays for Peñarol. Mainly an attacking midfielder, he can also play as a right winger. Sánchez is often nicknamed as "Pato" ("Duck") in his native country Uruguay.

Early life
Born in Montevideo, Sánchez was abandoned by his father at the age of eight, and lived with his mother and four brothers in his uncle's house; around that time, he started cutting his kinky hair short in order to avoid being mocked by his schoolmates. With his mother working as a domestic employee and his uncle as a bricklayer, Sánchez worked part-time on a bakery to help on providing food to the family.

Club career

Liverpool Montevideo
Sánchez began his career with lowly side Nueva Juventud Baby Fútbol, and had failed trials at Montevideo Wanderers, Fénix, Cerro and River Plate until joining Liverpool's youth setup after a recommendation from Carlos Iglesias, and old coach of his at Salus FC. He was promoted to the main squad in 2003 by manager Julio Ribas, only six months after arriving at the club.

While at Liverpool, Sánchez played regularly for the club in the Uruguayan Primera División, and also overcame a serious injury which kept him sidelined for nearly two years.

Godoy Cruz
On 31 December 2009, Sánchez signed a two-year contract with Argentine Primera División side Godoy Cruz. He made his debut for the club the following 13 February, coming on as a second-half substitute for Leandro Torres in a 0–0 away draw against Huracán.

Sánchez scored his first goal for Godoy Cruz on 3 March 2010, netting the winner in a 2–1 home defeat of Lanús. He became an undisputed starter for the side during the 2010–11 season, contributing with four goals in 33 appearances.

River Plate

On 20 July 2011, Sánchez and Godoy Cruz teammate Martín Aguirre joined River Plate for a fee of US$ 2.9 million. River retained 50% of his federative rights. He made his debut for the club on 17 August by playing the full 90 minutes in a 1–0 Primera B Nacional home win against Chacarita Juniors, and scored his first goal three days later by netting the last in a 3–1 away defeat of Independiente Rivadavia.

Bought outright in 2012, Sánchez was an undisputed starter for the Millonarios in the following campaigns, and scored a brace in a 5–0 home routing of former side Godoy Cruz on 7 October 2012. On 9 August 2013, he was loaned to Liga MX side Puebla, mainly to free up a foreign player registration.

Sánchez returned to River in June 2014, and renewed his contract until December 2016 on 9 July. He scored a double in a 3–0 home success over Defensa y Justicia on 28 August, and finished the year as champions of the Copa Sudamericana. During the 2015 campaign, he was a regular starter in the Copa Libertadores winning run, scoring in the second leg of the Final against Tigres UANL (3–0 aggregate win).

Sánchez also scored one goal in the 2015 Suruga Bank Championship, netting the opener in a 3–0 win against Gamba Osaka. On 31 December 2015, he was named the South American Footballer of the Year, beating Carlos Tevez and Miller Bolaños and becoming the first Uruguayan to win the award after Enzo Francescoli in 1995.

Monterrey
On 14 November 2015, Monterrey announced that they had reached an agreement River for the transfer of Sánchez. He was presented on 22 December, signing a three-year contract with the club.

Santos

On 23 July 2018, Brazilian Série A side Santos FC announced the signing of Sánchez on a three-year deal. He made his debut on 4 August, starting in a 0–0 away draw against Botafogo.

Sánchez made his Libertadores debut for Peixe on 21 August 2018, starting in a 0–0 away draw against Independiente. He was, however, suspended for assaulting a ball boy during a Sudamericana match for River back in 2015, and Santos was given a 3–0 defeat; he was still declared free to play the second leg at the Pacaembu Stadium, which also ended in a 0–0 draw.

Sánchez was subsequently a regular starter for the club, but suffered a knee injury which kept him out for the remainder of the 2020 season in October. On 7 June 2021, he renewed his contract until July 2023.

On 28 July 2021, Sánchez scored a stoppage-time goal in a 4–0 Copa do Brasil home win over Juazeirense through a penalty kick, and took his tally at the club to 27 goals, becoming the foreigner who scored more goals for Santos, surpassing Jonathan Copete. On 4 January 2023, he terminated his contract with the club, after scoring 32 goals in 160 official matches.

Peñarol
Just hours after leaving Santos, Sánchez was announced at Peñarol back in his home country, on a one-year contract.

International career
On 13 November 2014, Sánchez made his debut for the Uruguay football team at the age of 29 against Costa Rica, starting in a 3–3 draw.

Sánchez was included in Uruguay's squad for the 2015 Copa América by coach Óscar Tabárez. He was also named among the 23-men for the Copa América Centenario.

Sánchez scored his first goal for the Celestes on 28 March 2017, netting the opener in a 2–1 loss against Peru. In May of the following year, he was named in Uruguay's provisional 26-man squad for the 2018 FIFA World Cup in Russia, being also included in the final list on 2 June.

Personal life
Sánchez's half-brother Nicolás De La Cruz is also a footballer. He too was groomed at Liverpool, and represents River Plate.

Sánchez obtained Argentine citizenship in December 2014.

Career statistics

Club

International

International goals
Scores and results list Uruguay's goal tally first.

Honours
River Plate
Primera B Nacional: 2011–12
Copa Libertadores: 2015
Copa Sudamericana: 2014
Recopa Sudamericana: 2015
Suruga Bank Championship: 2015

Monterrey
Copa MX: Apertura 2017

Individual
South American Footballer of the Year: 2015
Copa Libertadores Best XI: 2015
Recopa Sudamericana Top Scorer: 2015
Copa MX Top Scorer: Apertura 2017

References

External links

1984 births
Living people
Footballers from Montevideo
Uruguayan footballers
Association football midfielders
Association football wingers
Liverpool F.C. (Montevideo) players
Godoy Cruz Antonio Tomba footballers
Club Atlético River Plate footballers
Club Puebla players
C.F. Monterrey players
Santos FC players
Peñarol players
Uruguayan Primera División players
Argentine Primera División players
Primera Nacional players
Liga MX players
Campeonato Brasileiro Série A players
Copa Libertadores-winning players
Uruguay international footballers
2015 Copa América players
Copa América Centenario players
2018 FIFA World Cup players
Naturalized citizens of Argentina
Uruguayan expatriate footballers
Uruguayan expatriate sportspeople in Argentina
Uruguayan expatriate sportspeople in Mexico
Uruguayan expatriate sportspeople in Brazil
Expatriate footballers in Argentina
Expatriate footballers in Mexico
Expatriate footballers in Brazil